Mattheus Marinus Schepman (17 August 1847 – 19 November 1919) was a Dutch malacologist.  He was one of the foremost collectors of mollusc shells in the Netherlands, and was also high on the overall list of European collectors.

Dutch collectors developed an interest in natural history specimens that were collected on worldwide expeditions since the 16th century. An interest in conchology led to numerous shell publications. In 1934 the Nederlandse Malacologische Vereniging (Netherlands Malacological Society) was founded. In commemoration of its 75th anniversary, a book honoring in detail the work of Mattheus Schepman was published.

His research
Schepman was both a collector and a methodical scientist, which combination "made his collection of great value to the entire malacological community." He was given the opportunity to study a collection by Max Carl Wilhelm Weber, Director of the Zoölogisch Museum Amsterdam (ZMA). Many of the specimens he studied and collected were gathered by the Siboga Expedition. The expedition went to the  Indo-Malaysian Archipelago and investigated 322 sites.

Schepman's most significant work is reported in "The Prosobranchia of the Siboga expedition". HM Siboga was the transport ship for the eponymous "Siboga Expedition". Published over five years and consisting of 494 pages, it covers 212 genera and 1,467 species. Eduard von Martens was involved in mollusk identification from the first expedition, and he "probably recommended Schepman for the work on the second."  In any event, Schepman published seven volumes which described 2,500 specimens, and 1,235 shelled mollusc species, "many new to science."

An important aspect of his work was his scientific collection of shells, a collection which was almost unprecedented in scope and breadth. Eventually sold in 1920 to the Zoological Museum Amsterdam for ƒ7,205, the collection consisted of 9,000 species and 1,250 genera of shelled freshwater, marine, and land molluscs.

Published works

Schepman wrote over 62 malacological works. They include:
(incomplete)
 Horst R. & Schepman M. M. (1908). Catalogue systématique des mollusques (gastropodes prosobranches et polyplacophores). Tome XIII. Leiden.
  Schepman M. M. & Nierstrasz H. F. (1913). "Parasitische und kommensalistische Mollusken aus Holothurien". Stuttgart.

The Prosobranchia of the Siboga Expedition
 Schepman M. M. (1908). "The Prosobranchia of the Siboga Expedition. Part I, Rhipidoglossa and Docoglossa, with an appendix by R. Bergh". Uitkomsten op zoologisch, botanisch, oceanografisch en geologisch gebied verzameld in Nederlandsch Oost-Indië 1899–1900 aan boord H. M. Siboga, Monographie, E. J. Brill, Leyden, 49a: 107 pp., 9 plates.
 Schepman M. M. (1908). "The Prosobranchia of the Siboga Expedition. Part II, Taenioglossa and Ptenoglossa". 49b: 108–231, 7 plates.
 Schepman M. M. (1908). "The Prosobranchia of the Siboga Expedition. Part III, Gymnoglossa". 49c: 233–246, 1 plate.
  Schepman M. M. & Nierstrasz H. F. (1909). "Parasitische prosobranchier der Siboga-expedition". 49(2): 1–28, 2 plates.
 Schepman M. M. (1911). The Prosobranchia of the Siboga Expedition. "Part IV. Rachiglossa". 49d: 247–364, 7 plates.
 Schepman M. M. (1913). "The Prosobranchia of the Siboga Expedition. Part V Toxoglossa." 49e: 365–452, 6 plates.
 Schepman M. M. (1913). "The Prosobranchia of the Siboga Expedition. Part VI, Pulmonata and Opisthobranhia Tectibranchiata, tribe Bullomorpha." 49f: 453–494, 2 plates.

Taxa
Schepman described and named a large number of taxa of molluscs, mostly species, especially species of marine gastropods. For example, in November 2012, the World Register of Marine Species (WoRMS) listed 182 valid marine taxa (181 marine gastropods, 1 marine bivalve) that were described by Schepman.

Schepman originally described about 450 taxa, including many turrids. Examples of the numerous taxa he named and described are in the following list (synonyms are not included):

Families
Freshwater and marine cave snails:
 Neritiliidae Schepman, 1908

Genera
Sea snails (sorted chronologically):
 Guttula Schepman, 1908
 Pseudococculina Schepman, 1908
 Clavosurcula Schepman, 1913
 Daphnellopsis Schepman, 1913
 Meloscaphander Schepman, 1913
 Volvulopsis Schepman, 1913

Species
Land snails:
 Amphidromus reflexilahris Schepman
 Helicarion sumatrensis Schepman, 1886
 Asperitas bimaensis (Schepman, 1892)
 Dyakia densestriata Schepman, 1896
 Hemiplecta butikkoferi Schepman, 1896
 Euplecta costellifera Schepman, 1918
 Euplecta imperforata Schepman, 1918
 Macrochlamys imperforata Schepman, 1918
 Sitala crenocarinata Schepman, 1918
 Planispira planissima Schepman, 1918
 Cyclotus subcanaliculatus Schepman, 1918

Land slugs:
 Parmarion goedhuisi Schepman, 1896
 Microparmarion litteratus Schepman, 1896
 Hemicarion semicalcareus Schepman, 1896

Freshwater snails:
 Melania subplicata Schepman, 1886
 Melania snellemanni Schepman, 1886
 Bellamya liberiana (Schepman, 1888)
 Potadoma buttikoferi (Schepman, 1888)
 Potadoma liberiensis (Schepman, 1888)

 Melania glandiformis Schepman, 1896
 Melania schwaneri Schepman, 1896
 Brotia borneensis (Schepman, 1896)
 Melania mülleri Schepman, 1896
 Melania subpunctata Schepman, 1896

 Neritina (Clithon) subocellata Schepman, 1884<ref>Schepman M. M. (1884). "Neritina (Clithon) subocellata v. Martens, MS.". Notes from the Leyden Museum, VII: 49-50, plate 4, fig. 3.</ref> - a synonym of Clithon diadema Melania subcostellaris Schepman, 1918
 Melania sentaniensis Schepman, 1918
 Melania kampeni Schepman, 1918

Freshwater bivalves:
 Hyridella misoolensis (Schepman, 1897)
 Schepmania nieuwenhuisi (Schepman, 1898)
 Nausitora hedleyi Schepman, 1919 – brackish water species

Sea snails (sorted chronologically):

1870s and 1890s
 Entemnotrochus rumphii (Schepman, 1879)
 Nassarius javanus (Schepman, 1891)
 Oliva semmelinki Schepman, 1891
 Ergalatax martensi (Schepman, 1892)

1903
 Astralium provisorium (Schepman, 1903)

1904
 Oliva dubia Schepman, 1904
 Oliva rufofulgurata Schepman, 1904

1907
 Cerithium claviforme Schepman, 1907
 Cerithium koperbergi Schepman, 1907
 Nassarius celebensis (Schepman, 1907)
 Notadusta martini (Schepman, 1907)

1908
 Anatoma exquisita (Schepman, 1908)
 Anatoma maxima (Schepman, 1908)
 Ancistrobasis monodon (Schepman, 1908)
 Bathyfautor multispinosus (Schepman, 1908)
 Bathymophila callomphala (Schepman, 1908)
 Calliostoma crassicostatum Schepman, 1908
 Calliostoma quadricolor Schepman, 1908
 Calliostoma rufomaculatum Schepman, 1908
 Calliostoma simplex Schepman, 1908
 Calliostoma virgo Schepman, 1908
 Calliotropis bicarinata (Schepman, 1908)
 Calliotropis calcarata (Schepman, 1908)
 Calliotropis concavospira (Schepman, 1908)
 Calliotropis limbifera (Schepman, 1908)
 Calliotropis multisquamosa (Schepman, 1908)
 Calliotropis muricata (Schepman, 1908)
 Calliotropis pagodiformis (Schepman, 1908)
 Calliotropis pulchra (Schepman, 1908)
 Calliotropis spinulosa (Schepman, 1908)
 Danilia weberi Schepman, 1908
 Emarginella sibogae (Schepman, 1908)
 Emarginula foveolata Schepman, 1908
 Guttula sibogae Schepman, 1908
 Hadroconus sibogae (Schepman, 1908)
 Herpetopoma ringens (Schepman, 1908)
 Pectinodonta alta Schepman, 1908
 Pectinodonta orientalis Schepman, 1908
 Perrinia cancellata (Schepman, 1908)
 Perrinia nigromaculata (Schepman, 1908)
 Perrinia plicifera (Schepman, 1908)
 Perrinia squamicarinata (Schepman, 1908)
 Phenacolepas radiata Schepman, 1908
 Pseudococculina granulata Schepman, 1908
 Pseudococculina rugosoplicata Schepman, 1908
 Solariella ornatissima (Schepman, 1908)
 Tibatrochus incertus (Schepman, 1908)
 Tugalina plana (Schepman, 1908)

1909

 Abyssochrysos melvilli (Schepman, 1909)
 Akibumia orientalis (Schepman, 1909)
 Biplex aculeata (Schepman, 1909)
 Carenzia melvillii (Schepman, 1909)
 Cylindriscala humerosa (Schepman, 1909)
 Cylindriscala sibogae (Schepman, 1909)
 Eccliseogyra fragilissima (Schepman, 1909)
 Epitonium abyssicola (Schepman, 1909)
 Epitonium melvilli (Schepman, 1909)
 Fluxinella marginata (Schepman, 1909)
 Fluxinella trochiformis (Schepman, 1909)
 Goodingia varicosa (Schepman, 1909)
 Granosolarium mirabile (Schepman, 1909)
 Gregorioiscala nierstraszi (Schepman, 1909)
 Heliacus costatus (Schepman, 1909)
 Heliacus madurensis (Schepman, 1909)
 Inella verluysi (Schepman, 1909)
 Niso smithi Schepman, 1909
 Pelseneeria sibogae (Schepman & Nierstrasz, 1909)
 Primovula roseomaculata (Schepman, 1909)
 Quinnia sykesi (Schepman, 1909)
 Seguenzia costulifera Schepman, 1909
 Seguenzia dautzenbergi Schepman, 1909
 Seila versluysi (Schepman, 1909)
 Stellaria gigantea (Schepman, 1909)
 Stilapex eburnea (Schepman & Nierstrasz, 1909)
 Stilapex parva (Schepman, 1909)
 Subularia circumstriata Schepman, 1909
 Triphora schmidti Schepman, 1909
 Trivellona abyssicola (Schepman, 1909)
 Trivellona paucicostata (Schepman, 1909)
 Trivellona sibogae (Schepman, 1909)

1911
 Amalda abyssicola Schepman, 1911
 Amalda edgariana Schepman, 1911
 Antillophos minutus (Schepman, 1911)
 Babelomurex ricinuloides (Schepman, 1911)
 Chryseofusus chrysodomoides (Schepman, 1911)
 Cyllene sibogae Schepman, 1911
 Eosipho smithi (Schepman, 1911)
 Chryseofusus chrysodomoides (Schepman, 1911)
 Fusinus thielei (Schepman, 1911)
 Manaria brevicaudata (Schepman, 1911)
 Mitrella circumstriata (Schepman, 1911)
 Mitrella simplex (Schepman, 1911)
 Mitrella undulata (Schepman, 1911)
 Nassarius crebricostatus (Schepman, 1911)
 Nassarius macrocephalus (Schepman, 1911)
 Nassarius multipunctatus (Schepman, 1911)
 Pagodula obtuselirata (Schepman, 1911)
 Pagodula pulchella (Schepman, 1911)
 Pazinotus sibogae (Schepman, 1911)
 Pazinotus smithi (Schepman, 1911)
 Peristernia incerta Schepman, 1911
 Preangeria dentata (Schepman, 1911)
 Turrilatirus melvilli (Schepman, 1911)
 Ziba abyssicola (Schepman, 1911)

1913
 Acamptodaphne biconica (Schepman, 1913)
 Anticlinura biconica (Schepman, 1913)
 Asperdaphne elegantissima (Schepman, 1913)
 Asperdaphne suluensis (Schepman, 1913)
 Belomitra brachytoma (Schepman, 1913)
 Benthomangelia celebensis (Schepman, 1913)
 Benthomangelia trophonoidea (Schepman, 1913)
 Borsonia smithi Schepman, 1913
 Borsonia timorensis (Schepman, 1913)
 Brachytoma rufolineata (Schepman, 1913)
 Buccinaria abbreviata (Schepman, 1913)
 Clavosurcula sibogae Schepman, 1913
 Cochlespira pulchella (Schepman, 1913)
 Comitas melvilli (Schepman, 1913)
 Comitas obtusigemmata (Schepman, 1913)
 Comitas pagodaeformis (Schepman, 1913)
 Crassispira aesopus (Schepman, 1913)
 Crassispira rubidofusca (Schepman, 1913)
 Cryptodaphne affinis (Schepman, 1913)
 Cryptodaphne gradata (Schepman, 1913)
 Cytharopsis butonensis (Schepman, 1913)
 Daphnella celebensis Schepman, 1913
 Daphnellopsis lamellosa Schepman, 1913
 Diniatys dubius (Schepman, 1913)
 Duplicaria tiurensis (Schepman, 1913)
 Emarginula paucipunctata Schepman, 1913
 Euclathurella subuloides (Schepman, 1913)
 Gemmula sibogae (Schepman, 1913)
 Gemmula truncata (Schepman, 1913)
 Glyphostoma granulifera (Schepman, 1913)
 Guraleus halmaherica (Schepman, 1913)
 Guraleus savuensis (Schepman, 1913)
 Gymnobela ceramensis (Schepman, 1913)
 Gymnobela dubia (Schepman, 1913)
 Gymnobela pulchra (Schepman, 1913)
 Gymnobela sibogae (Schepman, 1913)
 Horaiclavus madurensis (Schepman, 1913)
 Horaiclavus multicostata (Schepman, 1913)
 Inquisitor aesopus (Schepman, 1913)
 Inquisitor subangusta (Schepman, 1913)
 Isodaphne perfragilis (Schepman, 1913)
 Ithycythara septemcostata (Schepman, 1913)
 Leucosyrinx pyramidalis (Schepman, 1913)
 Lienardia peristernioides Schepman, 1913
 Lioglyphostomella timorensis (Schepman, 1913)
 Maoridaphne supracancellata (Schepman, 1913)
 Maoritomella batjanensis (Schepman, 1913)
 Marshallena nierstraszi (Schepman, 1913)
 Mioawateria extensaeformis (Schepman, 1913)
 Mucronalia variabilis Schepman in Voeltzkow, 1913
 Myurella exiguoides (Schepman, 1913)
 Neopleurotomoides rufoapicata (Schepman, 1913)
 Otitoma kwandangensis (Schepman, 1913)
 Otitoma timorensis (Schepman, 1913)
 Paracomitas undosa (Schepman, 1913)
 Pleurotomella clathurellaeformis Schepman, 1913
 Pseudodaphnella virgo (Schepman, 1913)
 Pseudoetrema crassicingulata (Schepman, 1913)
 Pseudorhaphitoma multigranosa (Schepman, 1913)
 Sabatia supracancellata (Schepman, 1913)
 Scaphander sibogae Schepman, 1913
 Scaphander subglobosus Schepman, 1913
 Shutonia variabilis (Schepman, 1913)
 Splendrillia suluensis (Schepman, 1913)
 Stellatoma rufostrigata (Schepman, 1913)
 Terebra virgo Schepman, 1913
 Trophon celebensis Schepman, 1913
 Typhlosyrinx supracostata (Schepman, 1913)
 Xanthodaphne pyriformis (Schepman, 1913)

1914
 Megadenus voeltzkovi Schepman & Nierstrasz, 1914

1922
 Thaisella dubia (Schepman, 1922)

In honor 
Taxa named in his honor include (sorted chronologically):

Marine snails:
 Epitonium schepmani (Melvill, 1910)
 Argyropeza schepmaniana Melvill, 1912
 Natica schepmani Thiele, 1925
 Pagodidaphne schepmani (Thiele, 1925)
 Trivellona schepmani (Schilder, 1941)
 Lucerapex schepmani Shuto, 1970
 Clavosurcula schepmani Sysoev, 1997
 Mitra schepmani Salisbury & Guillot de Suduiraut, 2003
 Mitrella schepmani Monsecour & Monsecour, 2007

Bivalves:
 Neilonella schepmani Prashad, 1932

See also
 Rudolph Bergh
 Paul Mayer (zoologist)
 Jean Paul Louis Pelseneer
 Edgar Albert Smith

 References 

 Further reading 
 
 Bibliography, Gastropodus stromboidea
  HOLLIS# 012949244 QL31.M27 B55 2010
 Taylor J. W. (1908). Monograph of the land & freshwater Mollusca of the British Isles. Leeds, Taylor Brothers, vol. 3: viii + 522 pp., 35 plates. page 67.
 van der Bijl A. N. (1996). "The correspondence between M. M. Schepman and W. H. Dall". The Festivus 28(2): 18–20.
 
 Genealogy of Mattheus Marinus Schepman
 K. Götting: Malakozoologie. Grundriss der Weichtierkunde''. G. Fischer, Stuttgart 1974
 
 

1847 births
1919 deaths
Conchologists
Dutch malacologists
People from Albrandswaard